Faith Theological Seminary is an unaccredited evangelical Christian seminary in Baltimore, Maryland. It was founded in 1937 in Wilmington, Delaware, moved to Philadelphia in 1952, and then moved to Maryland in 2004.

History
In response to the Presbyterian controversies of the early twentieth century, in 1929, under the leadership of J. Gresham Machen, a group of scholars was organized to start a new institution. The original faculty consisted of Oswald T. Allis, Robert Dick Wilson, Allan A. MacRae, John Murray, Paul Woolley, Cornelius Van Til, Rienk Bouke Kuiper, and Ned Stonehouse. They found quarters for the new seminary (Westminster Theological Seminary) in two townhouses in Philadelphia, housing students in the Drake Hotel. John Gresham Machen died on Jan. 1, 1937, leaving behind a diverse movement of conflicting concerns and convictions that led to the founding of Faith Theological Seminary the following summer of 1937. 

Faith Theological Seminary was officially independent (by the design of the "Certificate of Incorporation of Faith Theological Seminary, Inc." Feb 7, 1938) of any specific denomination's control. There was, however, considerable support from the Bible Presbyterian Church, which was also founded in 1937 by many of the same individuals who founded the seminary. FTS was at that time also "closely identified" with the American Council of Christian Churches and the International Council of Christian Churches.

Allan A. MacRae served as the first president of FTS from 1937 until 1971. FTS initially used the facilities of the First Independent Church of Wilmington (later Faith Bible Presbyterian Church), pastored by Harold Laird. FTS grew in size and moved to Huston Hall in Wilmington in 1941, then to Lynnewood Hall (the former Widener estate) in Elkins Park, Pennsylvania, in 1952. Carl McIntire served as president from 1972 until 2002.

Subsequent to McIntire's death, Norman J. Manohar assumed the presidency, moving the seminary to Maryland, until 2019 when he was terminated by the board of directors for having fraudulently represented his degrees to accreditors (Maryland Higher Education Commission [MHEC] Investigative Report of Sept 9, 2019, states that claiming unearned credentials is "incongruent with the 'demonstrated history of ethical practice required by COMAR 13B.02.02.13B'"). MHEC subsequently removed FTS authorization on June 15, 2020. A private Attorney's Investigative Report of January 14, 2019 identified misrepresentation of academic credentials (particularly a falsely claimed Ph.D.), a lack of documentary evidence of other degree claims, and financial malfeasance.

In 2020, the seminary's board of directors selected Jerry Harmon to serve as president. The board also dissolved the FTS 501c3 to support a new seminary called Faith Theological Seminary of Catonsville (FTSOC). J. Harmon has since been serving as president and as a professor under the reincorporated FTSOC.

Academics
Faith Theological Seminary previously offered a Bachelor of Arts (BA) in Religion, a Master of Divinity (M.Div.), a Doctor of Ministry (D.Min.), and a Doctor of Theology (Th.D.) degree. The institution was accredited by the Transnational Association of Christian Colleges and Schools (TRACS) but lost accreditation in May 2020. When Faith Theological Seminary lost its accreditation from TRACS in May 2020, the state of Maryland also subsequently suspended its degree-granting privileges. It was closed with a teach-out plan implemented with Lancaster Bible College and Capital Seminary. In 2021, Faith Theological Seminary of Catonsville reincorporated and received a religious exemption approval to operate in the state of Maryland and grant undergraduate and graduate degrees.

Notable alumni
Arthur Glasser, 1942
Vernon Grounds, 1940
Kenneth Kantzer, 1942
Francis Schaeffer, 1938
Arthur E. Steele, 1959
Timothy Tow

References

External links
 Official website

Evangelical seminaries and theological colleges in the United States
Seminaries and theological colleges in Maryland